Robert da Grava (born 17 August 1944) is a retired Luxembourgian football midfielder.

References

1944 births
Living people
Luxembourgian footballers
Jeunesse Esch players
Association football midfielders
Luxembourg international footballers